Subhadra is a 1941 Indian Kannada film directed by P. Pullaiah based on a work of B. Puttaswamayya, who also wrote the film's screenplay. The film stars Gubbi Veeranna and Honnappa Bhagavathar in the lead roles. Musician B. Devendrappa, B. Raghavendra Rao, Vasudeva Girimaji, B. Jayamma, G. V. Malathamma and Gangubhai Gulegudda feature in supporting roles. Music for the film was composed by Padmanabha Shastry, Mallikarjun Mansur and Narahari Sastry.

Cast
 Gubbi Veeranna
 Honnappa Bhagavathar
 B. Devendrappa 
 H. Ramachandra Shastry
 B. Raghavendra Rao
 Vasudeva Girimaji
 B. Jayamma
 G. V. Malathamma
 Gangubhai Gulegudda

References

External links
 

1941 films
1940s Kannada-language films
Indian black-and-white films